Kafil Ahmed (born 1 September 1962) is a contemporary Bangladeshi poet, singer and artist. He is particularly  known for his work in the songs for all beings, A new type of Bangla soul music.  In addition to this, he produces water-colors and acrylic paintings.

Early life and education
Kalif had other publications in different literature magazines, literature supplements and other forms of non-traditional publications medias.

Kafil was born on 1 September 1962 at Kishoreganj in East Pakistan (present-day Bangladesh). Kafil Ahmed belongs to a progressive farming family. His father Abdur Rahman Maru Sarkar was a social worker and inspirational person for an organizer of progressive farmers' movement. Maleka Akhter is his mother. Kafil Ahmed did his bachelor in English linguistics and literature from Jahangirnagar University. He is one of the organizers of 'Mon Kohuar Gaan and Sarbapran Sangskritik Shakti".  He published his first collection of poetry "Junction" as a student. The book was published by Brintok Publishers (1987).

Career
A self-taught musician, Kafil's musical work started with adding tunes to the years old Chorjageeti in the 1990s. The live performance in different parts of the country of the age-old rhymes was along with instruments and drama. The performance also included songs from his own creation and arrangement. In 2002, Kafil's first collection of his written songs entitled Mighty power in wings of feather, Maya in the eyes of cows was released from Ghorautra Production, Dhaka. The album consisted of tracks such as Mesh your soul with the other one, Fire Eater, Fire Sleeper and Stands a horse with a broken neck. The album is considered as one of the pioneers in the trend of new songs in Bangla music by rejuvenating the thousand years old trend of Shomogeet and Gonoshongeet.

Kafil is also a painter whose works have been published in books and little magazines since the 1980s. His artworks with water color and acrylic have long been considered as new trend setters in modern art of Bangladesh.

References

1962 births
Living people
Bangladeshi male poets
21st-century Bangladeshi male singers
21st-century Bangladeshi singers
Bangladeshi painters
Jahangirnagar University alumni
20th-century Bangladeshi male singers
20th-century Bangladeshi singers